Ondrej Kutlík (born September 9, 1976 in Námestovo, Žilina) is a Slovak weightlifter. Kutlik represented Slovakia at the 2008 Summer Olympics in Beijing, where he competed for the men's light heavyweight class (85 kg). Kutlik placed twelfth in this event, as he successfully lifted 150 kg in the single-motion snatch, and hoisted 193 kg in the two-part, shoulder-to-overhead clean and jerk, for a total of 343 kg.

References

External links
NBC 2008 Olympics profile

1976 births
Living people
Olympic weightlifters of Slovakia
Weightlifters at the 2008 Summer Olympics
People from Námestovo
Sportspeople from the Žilina Region
Slovak male weightlifters